The 1948–49 British Home Championship was a football tournament played between the British Home Nations. The tournament was notable for it being the final competition the Home Nations competed in before they joined the FIFA World Cup and thus the last time it was the most important international football tournament in Britain.

England began the tournament the strongest with a 6–2 success over the Irish in Belfast. Scotland began well also, beating the Welsh in Cardiff, which they followed with a narrow success against Ireland in a highly competitive match. England too took maximum points from their second game with a close 1–0 win over the Welsh. In the final games, Wales beat Ireland to take third place whilst the Scots succeeded in strongly defeating England at Wembley Stadium to take the championship.

Table

Results

References

1949 in British sport
1948 in British sport
1948-49
1948–49 in English football
1948–49 in Scottish football
1948–49 in Northern Ireland association football
1948–49 in Welsh football